East Brunswick Public Schools is a comprehensive community public school district serving students from kindergarten through twelfth grade in East Brunswick, in Middlesex County, New Jersey, United States.

As of the 2018–19 school year, the district, comprised of 11 schools, had an enrollment of 8,260 students and 687.0 classroom teachers (on an FTE basis), for a student–teacher ratio of 12.0:1.

The district is classified by the New Jersey Department of Education as being in District Factor Group "I", the second-highest of eight groupings. District Factor Groups organize districts statewide to allow comparison by common socioeconomic characteristics of the local districts. From lowest socioeconomic status to highest, the categories are A, B, CD, DE, FG, GH, I and J.

Awards and recognition
East Brunswick is the only district in the State of New Jersey having eleven schools designated Blue Ribbon School / National School of Excellence by the United States Department of Education. Schools that have been recognized as Blue Ribbon Schools are
Irwin School (1989–90),
East Brunswick High School (1990–91),
Lawrence Brook School (1991–92),
Churchill Junior High School (1994–95),
Hammarskjold Middle School (1994–95),
Bowne-Munro School (1996–97),
Murray A. Chittick Elementary School (1998–99),
Warnsdorfer Elementary School (2000–01),
Frost Elementary School (2010–11),
Central Elementary School (2011–12), and
Memorial Elementary School (2012–13).

The district was selected as one of the top "100 Best Communities for Music Education in America 2005" by the American Music Conference.

Students from all schools, particularly EBHS, have garnered state and national honors in academics, athletics, and the arts.

Schools
East Brunswick Public Schools' facilities consists of 11 school facilities plus two administration buildings; in addition, the East Brunswick Public Library serves as a repository for public examination of all curricula as well as serving as an important education-related resource for the community.

Schools in the district (with 2020-21 enrollment data from the National Center for Education Statistics) are:

Elementary Schools
Bowne-Munro Elementary School (with 240 students; in grades K-4)
Ronald Lieberman, Principal
Central Elementary School (430; PreK-4)
Thomas Husar, Principal
Murray A. Chittick Elementary School (469; PreK-4)
Christine Sce, Principal
Robert Frost Elementary School (449; PreK-4)
Lauretta Payette, Principal
Irwin Elementary School (378; K-4)
JoAnn Chmielowicz, Principal
Lawrence Brook Elementary School (431; PreK-4)
Elizabeth Dunn, Principal
Memorial Elementary School (527; PreK-4)
Cheryl Jones, Principal
Warnsdorfer Elementary School (447; PreK-4)
Joseph Csatari, Principal
Hammarskjold Upper Elementary School (1,297; 5-6)
Michael Gaskell, Principal
Sara DiMaggio, Assistant Principal
Enoch Nyamekye, Assistant Principal

Junior High School
Churchill Junior High School (1,336; 7-9)
Matthew Hanas, Principal
Jennifer Cunningham, Assistant Principal
Ian Evanovich, Assistant Principal
Alexia Deluca, Assistant Principal

High School 
East Brunswick High School (2,033; 10-12)
Michael W. Vinella, Principal
Russell Petronko, Assistant Principal         
Christopher Yannazzo, Assistant Principal
Glen Pazinko, Assistant Principal

Other Facilities                                  
Jon R. Kopko Administration Building
The East Brunswick Public Schools Administration Building, renamed in honor of long-time Superintendent of Schools Jon R. Kopko upon his retirement in 2000, is situated at 760 Route 18 North. Government-access television Board of Education meetings are held in the Administration building and are televised by EBTV to Comcast Cable TV subscribers within the Township.
Support Operations Building
The East Brunswick Public Schools Support Operations Building, located at 18 Edgeboro Road, houses the district's transportation department office and school bus parking lot as well as the Buildings and Grounds/maintenance department.

Expansion
In 10 years 1994 through 2004, the number of students served by East Brunswick Public Schools grew by 1,850 students, the equivalent of 60 to 75 new classrooms (on the basis of 25 to 30 students each), reflecting the population growth in East Brunswick as a whole. This growth led to overcrowding at elementary schools, necessitated busing to transport students to schools when there was no existing facility near their home and required the use of trailers at the Middle School to accommodate the influx of students. With additional property zoned for residential use, school population was expected to grow in the years ahead.

In the State of New Jersey, schools are funded primarily by property taxes, which increased at a rate of 7% annually from 2000 to 2007. Rapid rises in property taxes tend to cause seniors and empty-nesters to sell their existing homes to families with children, which led to further increases to the school-age population.

In December 2004, following a public campaign in its support, voters approved a $106.1 million referendum for the additions and improvements at Central, Lawrence Brook, and Hammarskjold Middle Schools. Previous bond referendums in 1994 and 1995 had failed to obtain voter approval.  For 2004, an additional ca. $54 million believed necessary for renovations at other East Brunswick School facilities (which would have brought the total to $160 million) was deferred.

Of this sum, $24.7 million was to be contributed by the State of New Jersey.  The rebuilding of Hammarskjold Middle School was planned to cost $66.5 million, of which $12.3 million was to have come from the State.  Central School renovation and expansion were planned to cost ca. $20.7 million, of which $6.4 million was to have come from the State.  Lawrence Brook School renovation and expansion were expected to cost ca. $19 million, of which ca. $6 million was to have come from the State.

Decommissioned facilities
Several older prewar school facilities in East Brunswick have been decommissioned.  They date from the period before the rapid expansion of East Brunswick in the 1960s and provide a glimpse of how the Township appeared before the burgeoning residential build-outs of the 1950s and, on minimum-1/3 acre plots, of the 1960s.  The few prewar school structures that remain are readily identifiable as red-brick, two-story buildings. McGinnis School (at Dunhams Corner Road and Hardenburg Lane), opened in 1926 and last used for instruction in 1978, was demolished in January 2015. It has been replaced by a parochial school building of similar form, built by Torah Links of Middlesex County. Weber School (at Riva Avenue and Hardenburg Lane), a near-twin of McGinnis, was sold in 2006 to St. Mary Coptic Orthodox Church, which continues to use the building as a school.

Special education
Special education is a key component of the education provided by East Brunswick Public Schools to eligible students.

East Brunswick Public Schools provides such services in compliance with the Federal Individuals with Disabilities Education Act (IDEA) and related State of New Jersey Statutes. Accordingly, each eligible student is educated in a least restrictive environment (LRE) according to an individualized education plan (IEP) drafted by his or her child study team (CST) consisting of school personnel and parents.  Eligibility determinations are made every three years.  Special services may include speech therapy, occupational therapy, educational aides, and other services as appropriate and called for.  A Director of Special Education, currently Sharon Weber-Oleszkiewicz, manages East Brunswick Public Schools' program of providing special services.  At the district level, the Director is supported by a Supervisor of  Elementary School Special Education, a Supervisor of Secondary School Special Education, and a Supervisor of Autism Spectrum Program.

Special education is supported at the schools by individual professionals including specialists (math, reading, and speech), special education teachers, teacher resource personnel, teacher aides, and child study team personnel (a category which may include psychologists, learning disabled teaching consultants, and social workers).  These individuals come into direct contact with those students who require special services.

Students receiving special services may be eligible for participation in an extended school year (ESY) program by which they attend instructional classes during the summer.

Pre-school and kindergarten students eligible for special education services receive instruction from an early age and full-time kindergarten (conventionally, East Brunswick Public Schools offers only half-day kindergarten).

There are multiple resources and support groups available to parents of disabled children.  For example, the State of New Jersey operates the Division of Developmental Disabilities.  The East Brunswick Special Education PTA (SEPTA) offers a valuable website. Another organization of value for those interested in autism-spectrum disorder is COSAC (Center for Outreach and Services for the Autism Community), and yet another is ASPEN (Asperger's Syndrome Education Network).

Individualized Education Program (IEP) process
East Brunswick Public Schools has a commitment to special education.

The processes mandated by IDEA, while saving the educational lives of many affected students, also pose many challenges to educators and parents.  The IEP process can be lengthy.  A child requiring special services needs a substantial investment in time on the part of the parents, the child's greatest advocate.  Parents need to consider outside evaluations and consult with others.  Parents may refer to the published curricula made available by East Brunswick Public Schools at The East Brunswick Public Library.  East Brunswick Public Schools uses "leveled reading" terminology to specify reading skills.  Leveling schemes are highly technical.  One scheme by which, e.g., "Level J" is an end-of-first-grade reading level, is the Fountas and Pinnell "Benchmark Assessment" System.  Achieving a properly defined plan, it is important to conduct a full and proper evaluation.  The individualized aspect of the IEP is critical.

Educating a special needs child is a project.  Project planning is a discipline in industry and government.  It can be challenging to provide the ongoing monitoring of progress and support of course-correction activity that is required to provision a high-quality planned educational program to eligible students.

The IDEA guarantees the services needed by special students.  It is wise for parents to familiarize themselves with relevant portions of the IDEA text.  Alternatively one may team with an advocate who can, potentially, attend the IEP meetings with parents.

Administration
Core members of the district's administration are:
Dr. Victor Valeski, Superintendent
Bernardo Giuliana, Business Administrator / Board Secretary

The Superintendent is Victor Valeski, whose appointment was announced by the East Brunswick Board of Education in March 2014, and became effective July 1, 2014.

Superintendent of Schools Murray A. Chittick served from 1929 through 1957. Superintendent of Schools Joseph Sweeney served from the early 1970s through the mid 1980s.  Superintendent of Schools Jon Kopko served from 1989 through 2000. Superintendent of Schools Jamie Savedoff served from July 2000 through March 2003. Superintendent of Schools Jo Ann Magistro served from 2003 through 2013. Interim Superintendent of Schools Patrick Piegari served from 2013 through 2014.

Board of education
The district's board of education, comprised of nine members, sets policy and oversees the fiscal and educational operation of the district through its administration. As a Type II school district, the board's trustees are elected directly by voters to serve three-year terms of office on a staggered basis, with three seats up for election each year held (since 2012) as part of the November general election. The board appoints a superintendent to oversee the day-to-day operation of the district.

References

External links
East Brunswick Public Schools
East Brunswick Municipal Access TV
East Brunswick Education Foundation
East Brunswick Education Association

School Data for the East Brunswick Public Schools, National Center for Education Statistics

East Brunswick, New Jersey
New Jersey District Factor Group I
School districts in Middlesex County, New Jersey